Maxime Siroux (25 October 1907 – 26 January 1975) was a French architect and archaeologist. He worked with Andre Godard in Iran for many years. The design of the Tomb of Hafez has been attributed to him, among other works. The design of Iran's National Museum is also attributed to him and fellow Frenchman Andre Godard.

References

1907 births
1975 deaths
20th-century French architects
French archaeologists
French Iranologists
French curators
French expatriates in Iran
Architecture in Iran
École des Beaux-Arts alumni
20th-century archaeologists